Murat Öztürk (born 5 December 1969 in Sivas) is a Turkish football coach and former goalkeeper. He started his professional football career with Gençlerbirliği. He is currently the Goalkeeper Coach of İstanbul Başakşehir.

He earned a goalkeeper coaching licence in 2003. He has been working for İstanbul Başakşehir since 1 February 2021.

External links 
 Profil on IBFK.com.tr
 Profil on TFF.org

References 

1969 births
Living people
Turkish footballers
Association football goalkeepers
Gençlerbirliği S.K. footballers
Association football coaches
Fenerbahçe S.K. (football) non-playing staff
Konyaspor non-playing staff
Antalyaspor non-playing staff
İstanbul Başakşehir F.K. non-playing staff